The Brinton Collection is a collection of early cinematography that was used by William Franklin Brinton (1857–1919) for his traveling show in the Midwestern United States.

Background
It was preserved and discovered by history teacher, Michael Zahs, in a barn in Ainsworth, Iowa.

Collection 
The collection included footage of Teddy Roosevelt, the world'sfirst newsreel involving the 1900 Galveston hurricane and works by Georges Méliès that were thought to have been lost: The Wonderful Rose-Tree and The Triple-Headed Lady.

Legacy
The collection's history was recounted in a film documentary, Saving Brinton, in 2018.

References

Film preservation
History of film
Rediscovered American films